Stefano Caille (born 18 May 2000) is a French professional footballer who currently plays for Tours as a midfielder.

Professional career
Caille made his professional debut with Tours, in a 2–1 Ligue 2 loss to Stade Brestois on 29 September 2017, at the age of 17.

References

External links
 
 
 
 
 

2000 births
Living people
French footballers
France youth international footballers
Association football defenders
Tours FC players
Ligue 2 players